Terrabacter aerolatus is a species of Gram-positive, nonmotile, non-endospore-forming bacteria. Cells are either rods or coccoid. It was initially isolated from an air sample in Jeju Province, South Korea. The species was first described in 2007, and its name is derived from Latin aer (air) and latus (carried).

The optimum growth temperature for T. aerolatus is 30 °C and can grow in the 5-35 °C range. The optimum pH is 7.0-8.0, and can grow in pH 4.0-9.0.

References

Bacteria described in 2007
Intrasporangiaceae